The Exterminators is a Big Finish Productions audio drama based on the long-running British science fiction television series Doctor Who. David Tennant plays the lead role of Galanar.  Tennant would later go on to star in the revived television series as the tenth incarnation of the Doctor.

Cast
Galanar – David Tennant
Selestru – William Gaunt
Siy Tarkov – Steven Elder
Frey Saxton – Ishia Bennison
Kaymee Arnod – Laura Rees
Amur – Claudia Elmhirst
Carneill – Oliver Hume
Dan Culver – Peter Forbes
Japrice – Octavia Walters
Bulis Mietok – Ian Brooker
Telligan – Greg Donaldson
Sergic – Jeremy James
Roozell – Jane Goddard
Chauley – Philip Wolff
Mivas – Dot Smith
Seth – Sean Jackson
Susan Mendes – Sarah Mowatt
Saloran Hardew – Karen Henson
Morli – Dannie Carr
Jake – Colin McIntyre
The Daleks – Nicholas Briggs

External links
Big Finish Productions – The Exterminators

Dalek Empire audio plays
Audio plays by Nicholas Briggs